The Campeonato Nacional de Interligas (Spanish for National Championship of Interleague) is the biggest football event involving teams with combined players from different clubs of every regional leagues in Paraguay from all departments. The tournament is organized by the Unión del Fútbol del Interior (UFI).

History 
Its first edition was played in 1927, same year of foundation of the Unión del Fútbol del Interior. The tournament is played (with a few exceptions) every two years, and the winner qualifies to play the Copa San Isidro de Curuguaty championship game.

Winners

Titles per team

External links
Interligas champions by Juan Pablo Andrés at RSSSF
UFI Website

4